is a Japanese surname. Notable people with the surname include:

Entertainers
, Japanese stage actress
, Japanese film actress
, Japanese film actress and singer, former AKB48 member

Politicians
, Japanese-born member of the American Communist Party
, 46th Prime Minister of Japan
, Japanese Osaka Ishin no Kai politician
, Democratic Party of Japan politician, former Minister of Internal Affairs and Communications
, Japanese Liberal Democratic Party politician, former Minister of Finance

Sportspeople
, Japanese figure skater
, Japanese football defender
, Japanese professional Grand Prix motorcycle road racer and auto racer
, Japanese javelin thrower
, Japanese Grand Prix motorcycle road racing world champion
, Japanese racing driver
, synchronized swimming coach in Japan, Olympic competitor for South Korea
, Japanese golfer
, Japanese ice hockey player
, Japanese cross-country mountain biker
, Japanese sumo wrestler
, Japanese football defender (J2 League)
, Japanese football forward (J2 League)
, Japanese baseball pitcher
, Japanese football forward (J2 League)
, Japanese snowboarder
Nobuaki Katayama, Japanese racing driver and automative engineer

Writers
, Japanese poet and translator
Elizabeth Kata (full name Elizabeth Colina Katayama; 1912–1998), Australian novelist
, Japanese novelist best known for Crying Out Love, In the Centre of the World
, Japanese author of light novels

Other
, Japanese architect who designed the original buildings for the Imperial Nara Museum and Kyoto Imperial museum
, Japanese automotive executive best known as the long-time president of Nissan's US operations
, Japanese interior designer
, Japanese historian of Inner Asia
Fred Katayama (born 1960), American television journalist of Japanese descent
, Japanese animator and director
, Japanese artist

See also
Katayama fever, another name for Schistosomiasis
Katayama Detachment of the Imperial Japanese Army's 2nd Division during World War II

Japanese-language surnames